Riaz Uddin Ahamed Siddique (born 1962), commonly known as Riaz, is a Bangladeshi film actor, producer, and television presenter who has appeared in more than 100 Bengali films in genres ranging from romance to action to comedies. He is the recipient of numerous awards, including three National Film Awards and seven Meril Prothom Alo Awards. He portrayed the famous literary character, Shuvro, created by Humayun Ahmed, in Daruchini Dip.

Riaz first appeared onscreen as a side role in filmmaker Dewan Nazrul's social action drama Banglar Nayok (1985). He began a full-time career in film with a leading role in the highly successful romantic drama Praner Cheye Priyo (1987). In 1995, Riaz worked with Bollywood actress Susmita Sen for Mahesh Manjrekar's film It Was Raining That Night. His last movie "Krishnopokkho" was released on 26 February 2016, directed by Meher Afroz Shaon. Riaz briefly served in the Bangladesh Air Force before joining the film industry.

Early life and military career

Riaz was born in 1972 to an aristocratic Muslim family in Faridpur District, Bangladesh. Riaz is the youngest child in his family. He has six sisters and a brother, Raisuddin Ahamed Siddique. He was brought up in CNB staff quarters of Faridpur for the first sixteen years of his life. His father, the late Zainuddin Ahamed Siddique, was a government service holder. His mother was Arjumand Ara Begum. His paternal home is in Jessore District. His father died in 1988.

Riaz participated in the examinations to be a pilot in the Bangladesh Air Force (BAF) right after his HSC results in 1988. He enrolled at the BAF Academy from 1989 to 1991 for flying training and to earn his bachelor's degree under Rajshahi University in science, he was commissioned as a Pilot Officer and became a fighter pilot in Bangladesh Air Force in 1991. However, he was dismissed from the air force in 1993, he was promoted till Flying Officer rank.

After withdrawal from the BAF, Riaz moved to Dhaka in 1994. There he met his cousin, actress Bobita, and started his film career in 1995. Riaz married Mushfika Tina, a Tv host, also a dance teacher, in a traditional Muslim wedding ceremony on 18 December 2007.

Career

In 1995, Riaz was in Dewan Nazrul's commercially successful film Banglar Nayok, although the movie did not bring him personal popularity. In 1997, Mohammad Hannan's romantic film Praner Cheye Priyo was an extraordinary commercial success, and Riaz became popular soon after. He works with many renowned filmmakers in Bangladesh, and has acted in numerous films that have been commercially successful. He was also in filmmaker Mahesh Manjrekar's film It Was Raining That Night and has acted in the English language. In this film, he acted with Sushmita Sen for the first time. Now he has become a popular heartthrob to millions of people in the country.

Early in his career, Riaz played some romantic roles in films such as Praner Cheye Priyo, Hridoyer Aina (1997), Kajer Meye, Prithibi Tomar Amar, Bhalobasi Tomake (1998), Biyer Phul, Narir Mon (1999), E Badhon Jabena Chire, Nishwase Tumi Biswase Tumi, Bhownkor Bishu (2000), Hridoyer Bandhon, O Priya Tumi Kothay (2001), Premer Taj Mahal (2002), Moner Majhe Tumi (2003), Wrong Number (2004), Hridoyer Kotha (2006) and Akash Chhoa Bhalobasa (2008).

He has acted in some literary adaptations, and in his career he has portrayed many consecutive roles to wide critical acclaim in films such as Dui Duari (2000), Shasti: Punishment, Megher Pore Megh: Clouds After Cloud and Shyamol Chhaya: The Green Shadow (2004), Hajar Bachhor Dhore: Symphony of Agony (2005), Bidrohi Padma and Khelaghar: Dollhouse (2006), Daruchini Dip and Ekjon Songe Chhilo (2007), Megher Koley Rod: Sunshine in the Clouds, Ki Jadu Korila and Chandra Grohon: The Lunar Eclipse (2008), Ebadat: The Worship (2009) and Modhumoti (2011). Riaz also acted in Ogni Bolaka a drama that is based on Birshreshtho Flight Lieutenant Matiur Rahman's life.

Filmography

Awards and nominations 

Riaz has received Three National Film Awards for his unique contribution in the Bangladesh film industry. Acting for the films Dui Duari ( 2000) by Humayun Ahmed, Daruchini Dip (2007) by Tauquir Ahmed and Ki Jadu Korila (2008) by Chandan Chowdhury.

National Film Awards 
Winner
 Best Actor for Dui Duari – 2000
 Best Actor for Daruchini Dwip – 2007
 Best Actor for Ki Jadu Korila – 2008

Meril Prothom Alo Awards 
Winner
 Best Actor for Praner Cheye Priyo – 1998
 Best Actor for Shashur Bari Zindabad  – 2001
 Best Actor for Premer Taj Mahal – 2002
 Best Actor for Moner Majhe Tumi – 2003
 Best Actor for (Critics) Shasti: Punishment – 2004
 Best Actor (Critics) Hajar Bachhor Dhore: Symphony of Agony – 2005
 Best Actor for Hridoyer Kotha – 2006

See also 
 Dhallywood
 Bangladeshi film actor
 Cinema of Bangladesh

References

External links 

 

Male actors in Bengali cinema
Bangladeshi film producers
Bengali film producers
Bangladeshi television personalities
Bangladeshi male models
People from Dhaka
People from Faridpur District
People from Jessore District
Best Actor National Film Award (Bangladesh) winners
Living people
1972 births
Bangladeshi male film actors
21st-century Bangladeshi male actors
20th-century Bangladeshi male actors
Bengali male actors